Powhatan Rural Historic District, formerly "Powhatan Hill Plantation" and before that "Hopyard Plantation", is a national historic district located near King George, King George County, Virginia. It encompasses 15 contributing buildings, 1 contributing site, and 3 contributing structures in a rural area near King George.  The district represents a significant reassemblage of the land holdings of Edward Thornton Tayloe, a member of the U.S. diplomatic service under Joel Roberts Poinsett, in the mid-19th century and one of Virginia's most affluent planters of that era; who inherited it from his father John Tayloe III, who built The Octagon House in Washington DC, and it was known then as 'Hopyard,' he inherited it from his father John Tayloe II who built the grand colonial estate Mount Airy. It contains three distinct historic residential farm clusters as well as two post-1950 stable complexes and several other auxiliary residential and agricultural buildings. The main house, known as Powhatan, is sited prominently on a ridge overlooking the Rappahannock River valley.

It was listed on the National Register of Historic Places in 1992.

References

Historic districts on the National Register of Historic Places in Virginia
Buildings and structures in King George County, Virginia
National Register of Historic Places in King George County, Virginia
Tayloe family of Virginia
Tayloe family residences